Frank Considine (1 April 1934 – 4 March 2001) was an Australian rules footballer who played in the Victorian Football League during the 1950s.  He played 21 games for Hawthorn between 1954 and 1957. He was recruited from the Old Paradians Amateur Football Club in the Victorian Amateur Football Association (VAFA).

His older brothers Bernie and Maurie also played football for Hawthorn.

References

External links

1934 births
2001 deaths
Australian rules footballers from Victoria (Australia)
Hawthorn Football Club players
Old Paradians Amateur Football Club players